"Wild Wild Angels" is a song by the British rock band Smokie from their 1976 studio album Midnight Café. It was the second of three singles from the album (the other ones were "Something's Been Making Me Blue" and "I'll Meet You at Midnight".)

Background and writing 
The song was written by Nicky Chinn and Mike Chapman and produced by Mike Chapman and Nicky Chinn.

Charts

References

External links 
 "Something's Been Making Me Blue" at Discogs

1976 songs
1976 singles
Smokie (band) songs
Songs written by Nicky Chinn
Songs written by Mike Chapman
Song recordings produced by Mike Chapman
RAK Records singles